Felipe Ángeles International Airport (IATA: NLU, ICAO: MMSM) is the second civilian airport serving the Mexico City metropolitan area, opened on March 21, 2022. Originally called Santa Lucía Airport (Mexican Air Force base no. 1), it was renamed after Felipe Ángeles (a general in the Mexican Revolution) in early 2021. In Spanish, its initialism is AIFA.

Construction started on October 17, 2019 after all judicial suspensions against the project were revoked. Two runways and a new terminal were planned during the first phase, which was completed on March 21, 2022, as scheduled. The airport is owned by the Mexican Government and operated by the Secretariat of National Defense (SEDENA) (through a subsidiary).

By territorial extension it is the largest airport in the State of Mexico and the second largest airport in the country behind Cancun International Airport.

History

Background 
The Santa Lucía Air Base was partially inaugurated in 1952, due to the need to relocate the Balbuena Military Air Field. The aerodrome was inaugurated on November 24, 1952, during the presidency of Miguel Alemán Valdés; however, the aircraft that still operated in Balbuena moved to Santa Lucía until 1959. It came to have a runway 3,780 meters long and 75 meters wide, which at the time was the widest paved runway in the country. Mexico and was named "General Alfredo Lezama Álvarez" in honor of who was its commander from 1961 to 1964.

In March 2018, as part of his campaign for the presidency, then-candidate Andrés Manuel López Obrador proposed the privatization of the Mexico City Texcoco Airport or the expansion of the Santa Lucía air base to convert it into an airport, finally leaning towards the latter.

In the first half of October 2018, López Obrador, already as president-elect, called for a popular consultation organized by the Arturo Rosenblueth Foundation and a group of citizens. The consultation was met with some controversy. In 2014, a law was enacted that institutes as a form of citizen participation, and the process that was carried out was a survey carried out by an individual and without official validity, where those who participated in this process could choose if they preferred to continue with the construction of the NAICM or interrupt it. The result favored the construction of Santa Lucía, 310,463 people (29% of the total) voted for the continuity of the Texcoco project and 747,000 voted in favor of Santa Lucía (69%).

Construction 
On April 24, 2019, Mexican president Andrés Manuel López Obrador announced that construction of the new airport would commence on April 29, 2019. On 12 June, a judge ordered the suspension of construction of the airport until environmental and cultural studies have been completed. The Secretariat of Environment and Natural Resources (SEMARNAT) announced its approval of construction of a terminal at the new airport site on July 17, 2019. Construction officially started on October 17, 2019. President López Obrador stated information regarding construction would be released in the coming days, saying transparency will be key in the project.

The airport is intended to focus on low-cost and cargo airlines to help relieve congestion at Mexico City International Airport. Mexican architect Francisco González Pulido and military general Gustavo Vallejo are in charge of airport design. The master plan is in charge of Groupe ADP and the airspace navigability studies were made by Airbus subsidiary NAVBLUE. The Valley of Mexico will be the first in the country where the performance-based navigation system (PBN) is used, which will allow the Felipe Ángeles International Airport, Mexico City International Airport and the Toluca International Airport to operate simultaneously without the operations of one impeding those of the others.

Remains of at least 200 mammoths were discovered during the construction of the terminal area, in the former Lake Xaltocan. Most of the newly discovered mammoths likely died after being trapped by mud in the ancient lake or hunted by other animals. Nothing was found that would require halting work on the airport project.

Construction occurred during the COVID-19 pandemic. Despite social distancing and other efforts to avoid infection, at least four employees were infected with the virus and there were 37 suspected cases along with three deaths as of June 9, 2020.

President López Obrador flew on the fifteen-minute Air Force inaugural flight from the Benito Juárez International Airport in Mexico City on February 10, 2021. He was accompanied by Luis Cresencio Sandoval González (SEDENA), Claudia Sheinbaum (head of government of Mexico City), Alfredo del Mazo (governor of the State of Mexico), Omar Fayad (governor of Hidalgo), Arturo Zaldívar (president of the Supreme Court), Dolores Padierna (vice president of the Chamber of Deputies), and José Rafael Ojeda Durán (SEMAR)

The airport's first terminal and two runways were officially opened on March 21, 2022. The inaugural commercial passenger flight, VivaAerobús flight 3280, departed from Guadalajara and landed at AIFA on March 21.

Access

Rail 

On March 19, 2020, a proposed 23-km extension of the Tren Suburbano commuter train was announced, which would branch off from the current line at Lechería station and head northeast, terminating at the airport, with delivery date in June 2023.

Bus 
Line I of the Mexibús bus rapid transit system connects the airport at Terminal de Pasajeros station to the Mexico City metro system at Ciudad Azteca station with an extension to AIFA to be completed by the time of the airport's opening. Mexibús Line IV is to be extended to AIFA at a later date, and will connect the airport to the metro at Indios Verdes station.

Car 
One of the main vehicular entrances to the AIFA will be the road interconnection to the Circuito Exterior Mexiquense, with an approximate length of four and a half kilometers. A wide road with three entry lanes and three exit lanes and sculptures of mammoths in the central part due to the discoveries, will provide high efficiency for transfers in a short time. The development will combine public transport systems with private transport.

The Mexico-Pachuca highway will also be extended towards the AIFA, in which there will be a deviation at the height of the town of Santa Lucía to connect with the airport.

It is expected that this road will be used mainly by cargo vehicles since it connects directly with the customs area and the domestic and international cargo terminal. It can also be used by passengers because there are diversions to the CEM and Camino a Tonanitla to get directly to the airport and avoid going around the loading area.

Airlines and destinations

Passenger

Cargo 
The only cargo airline with a sustained schedule is AeroUnion, operating a route to Tijuana that began flying on September 1st, 2022.

Statistics

Busiest Routes

See also
 Mexico City International Airport
 Transportation in Mexico
 Transport in Mexico City

References

External links

 Felipe Ángeles International Airport - official website 
 AIFA construction - official website  
 AIFA institutional website 

Airports established in 2022
2022 establishments in Mexico
Airports in the State of Mexico
Zumpango